Hillbrook is an independent, co-educational secondary school in Enoggera, Brisbane.

History
Hillbrook was founded on 31 May 1986. The school officially opened for the 1987 school year, providing three Year 8 classes in 1991. The school's original buildings were an orphanage before becoming a school. These buildings now house Science, Languages/Geography, Home Economics classrooms and computer labs. Each year level consists of four home classes, named by the colours red, white, blue and green.

The school's development has seen significant building activity, most significantly with the addition of a Performing Arts Complex in 2003(refurbished in 2014), in 2006 the Tree of Life Chapel (which coincided with the school's 20th anniversary) in 2009 a new library complex, in 2010 the Science classrooms were updated. 2014 sees significant building work continue with a new two-story building housing the Year 7 precinct and purpose-built Maths classrooms for Years 8 to 12. 2020 sees the completion of multiple projects including an extension to the library, general improvements to the central area and a new building that currently houses the science labs and cafeteria.

With the introduction of Year 7 in 2015, the school's student population grew to average approximately 720 students.

Hillbrook was started by a small group of people, including past headmaster Norm Hunter, and his original co-principal, John Lindsay.  Father Clarrie White was also part of this foundation group, along with Julie Lindsay and Rae Hunter.

In 2008, Geoff Newton, the deputy principal of Hillbrook, took over the role of principal following the retirement of Norm Hunter.

The Hillbrook School Leadership Team consists of one principal, two deputy principals, one finance manager and one business manager.

Curriculum
The school offers a curriculum based on the syllabi offered by the Queensland Studies Authority (QSA).  It does not offer vocational education subjects. Subjects unique to the school include PSD (Personal and Spiritual Development), Philosophical Inquiry and Global Studies (roughly equivalent to the QSA subject, Studies of Society and Environment, or SOSE).

The school has a significant Outdoor Education program, with students participating in a yearly camp and numerous activities throughout the year. These activities can include: Rockclimbing/Abseiling, Canoeing, Surf safety, various forms of Orienteering and a comprehensive Ropes Course. The activities are challenging and designed to promote confidence, resilience and teamwork.  The school competes in various team sports as well as district cross-country, regional sports, athletics and swimming for interested students.

Co-curricular
Hillbrook offers a range of co-curricular activities.  Typically these are offered in an arrangement known as 'Project Active' which emphasises fitness and the opportunity to engage in less mainstream activities.  The school offers dramatic options in the form of biennial school musicals and more informally as part of a drama extension program.  Productions have included Annie (2018), The Addams Family (2016), Beauty and the Beast (2014), The Boyfriend (2012), Little Shop of Horrors (2010), The Wizard of Oz (2008),  Biloxi Blues (2007), The Drought (2007), Peter Pan (2007), Away (2006), forget.me.never.after (2006),Grease (2006), The Insect Play (2006), The Crucible (2005), Pirates of Penzance (2004), Anything Goes (2002) and Joseph and the Amazing Technicolor Dreamcoat (2000), The Mikado (1998), SherWoodstock (1995) and Bugsy Malone (1990).  Other productions have included staff and past-students, including A Midsummer Night's Dream (2007), The Importance of Being Earnest (2005), Cosi (2004) and Love Letters (2003).

Governance
Hillbrook is governed by a School Council, consisting of 11 members.  Nine of these members are democratically elected, four from the parent body and five from the teaching staff. One representative is appointed by the Archbishop, and the Principal is an ex officio member.

The school emphasises a comparatively flat leadership structure, but responsibility for the school's day-to-day running rests with the School Leadership Team.

Eight Year 11 students are democratically elected each year to form the Student Representative Council Executive. A term in the SRC Executive lasts for two semesters, Semester II in Year 11 and Semester I in Year 12. The SRC Executive is responsible for leading the Student Representative Council which consists of two representatives from each Home Class in the school (excluding Year 12 Home Classes).

References

External links 
 

Anglican high schools in Brisbane
Educational institutions established in 1986
1986 establishments in Australia